"Gonna Give Her All the Love I've Got" is a 1967 Soul song, originally recorded and made a hit by Jimmy Ruffin on Motown's Soul Label imprint. Ruffin's 1967 original version, from his album Jimmy Ruffin Sings Top Ten, reached the Pop Top 30, peaking at #29, and was a Top 20 R&B Hit as well, peaking at #14. It was also a hit in Britain, reaching #26 on the UK Singles Chart. The song has a social context: it depicts a man anticipating his release from prison on the morrow, when he'll return home on a train to "the girl that I left behind," promising himself that he will reward her steadfast love for him by "giv[ing] her all the love [he's] got." The song was written by Norman Whitfield and Barrett Strong and produced by Whitfield.

In August 1968 Benny Gordon released his version on Wand 1188. 
Benny Gordon
Born	1932
Died	24 December 2008
Genres	Soul
Occupation(s)	Singer, songwriter and bandleader
Instruments	Vocals
Years active	1962 - 70s
Labels	RCA, Estill, Capitol, Wand.
Benny Gordon (1932–2008) was a soul and r&b singer who recorded from the early 1960s up to the 1970s. Some of his early efforts were as a member of Christian Harmonizers. Their recordings were credited to The Christian Harmonizers (Featuring B. Gordon). Later recordings were as Bennie Gordon And The Soul Brothers.[

In 1970, Jimmy Ruffin's Motown labelmate Marvin Gaye, released the song on the Tamla label. released from his album, That's the Way Love Is. Gaye's cover version of the song was a modest hit when Gaye released it in early 1970, peaking at #67 on the Billboard Hot 100 and at #26 on the Hot Selling Soul Singles chart. For Gaye the single was a double sided hit, as its flip side, "How Can I Forget" also charted (#41 US Pop, #18 US R&B).

Still another Motown act, The Temptations, recorded the tune as part of their album "The Temptations Wish It Would Rain.Williams, Otis and Romanowski, Patricia (1988, updated 2002). Temptations. Lanham, MD: Cooper Square. . However, it was The Temptations' baritone lead singer, Paul Williams, that sang lead vocals on the song, rather than Jimmy's brother, Temptations member David Ruffin. Their version was also released as a B-side to their hit single, "I Could Never Love Another (After Loving You)", which turned out to be Ruffin's last lead released before he left the group.

Tony Tribe did a single cover of the song with Trojan Records, before dying in a car accident in Canada in 1970.

Credits

Jimmy Ruffin version

Lead vocals by Jimmy Ruffin
Background vocals by The Originals and The Andantes
Instrumentation by The Funk Brothers and the Detroit Symphony Orchestra
Produced by Norman Whitfield

Marvin Gaye version
Lead (and additional background) vocals by Marvin Gaye
Instrumentation by The Funk Brothers and the Detroit Symphony Orchestra
Produced by Norman Whitfield

Temptations version
 Lead vocals by Paul Williams
 Background vocals by Eddie Kendricks, Melvin Franklin, David Ruffin, and Otis Williams
 Instrumentation by The Funk Brothers
 Produced By Norman Whitfield

References

1967 songs
1967 singles
1968 songs
1968 singles
1970 singles
Marvin Gaye songs
Jimmy Ruffin songs
The Temptations songs
Soul songs
Tamla Records singles
Songs about prison
Songs written by Barrett Strong
Songs written by Norman Whitfield
Song recordings produced by Norman Whitfield